Drenje is a municipality in Osijek-Baranja County, Croatia. There are 2,700 inhabitants, 95.7% of whom are Croats (2001 census).

References

Municipalities of Croatia